or just Noma Lighthouse is a lighthouse  in town of Mihama, Chita District, Aichi, Japan built during the Taishō period, located on Chita Peninsula in Mikawa Bay.

History
Noma Lighthouse was lit on March 10, 1921, and is the oldest lighthouse in Aichi Prefecture. In 2008, the lighthouse was extensively renovated, with its lens replaced by a 5th order Fresnel lens and light source replaced by LEDs. As a result, its output was decreased from approximately 15,000 candela to only 590 candela and effective range reduced from approximately 25 kilometers to 15 kilometers. The former lens is now on display at the museum at Daiōzaki Lighthouse in Mie Prefecture.

Lock Superstition
Noma Lighthouse in popular superstition was held to be a place that jinxed romance. However, there is a belief that if a couple attaches a padlock to the fence surrounding this lighthouse, their love will prosper.  The lighthouse is surrounded by a 2-meter high steel fence but, as result of locks accumulating, the fence has collapsed on several occasions due to the weight. In the year 2000, Mihama Town declared the area around the lighthouse to be a park, and the  established a small branch near the fence to receive the padlocks instead. In October 2011, the Nihon Fukushi University, also based in Mihama, set up a railing, designed as a musical score, as a place to also affix the padlocks.

See also

 List of lighthouses in Japan

References

Lighthouses completed in 1921
Lighthouses in Japan
Buildings and structures in Aichi Prefecture
Mihama, Aichi